Josef Odložil (11 November 1938 – 10 September 1993) was a Czech middle-distance runner. During the 1960s he was a national champion on numerous occasions but had mixed success at international level. He won a silver medal in the 1500 metres at the 1964 Tokyo Olympics.

Running career
An avid runner since early age, Odložil began training with a coach at a military school in Bratislava. At his first major competition, the 1962 European Athletics Championships in Belgrade, Odložil was eliminated in the 800 metres semi-final. Two years later he ran 1500 metres at the 1964 Summer Olympics in Tokyo. Peter Snell easily won the final, but Odložil managed to get silver ahead of John Davies. In 1965 Odložil set a new world record on 2000 m (5:01,2). The 1966 European Athletics Championships were disastrous for Odložil as he was eliminated already in the heats. He did better at the 1967 European Athletics Indoor Championships in Prague, taking silver in the 1500 m, but at the 1968 Olympics finished only eighth in the 1500 m. Odložil retired in 1969.

Retirement
After retiring from competitions Odložil, a career military officer, was also forced to retire from the Czechoslovak Army, for political reasons. He turned into coaching, first at Sparta Prague and then at the Institutio Nacional del Deporte in Mexico (1979–1981). In 1989 he was reinstated in the Army, and served there until his death. In 1992–1993 he was commander of UN peacekeepers in Iraq (UNGCI) representing Czechoslovakia.

Personal life and death
At the 1964 Olympics Odložil became a close friend of the winner, Peter Snell, and after the Olympics visited him in New Zealand. Shortly after the 1968 Olympics, Odložil married the famous gymnast Věra Čáslavská. The ceremony, which took place at the Mexico City Cathedral, drew a crowd of thousands. The couple had a son, Martin, and daughter, Radka. They divorced in 1987. On 7 August 1993 Odložil had a quarrel with his 19-year-old son. Martin hit him in the head, which resulted in a prolonged coma and death on 10 September 1993. Martin was sentenced to four years of imprisonment for his father's murder, but was granted a pardon by president Václav Havel in 1997, because the degree of fault on his father's death was not well proven.

Legacy
Since 1994 an athletic meet Josef Odložil Memorial is held annually in his memory.

References

External links 
 

1938 births
1993 deaths
People from Otrokovice
Czechoslovak male middle-distance runners
Czech male middle-distance runners
Olympic athletes of Czechoslovakia
Athletes (track and field) at the 1964 Summer Olympics
Athletes (track and field) at the 1968 Summer Olympics
Olympic silver medalists for Czechoslovakia
Accidental deaths from falls
Accidental deaths in the Czech Republic
Medalists at the 1964 Summer Olympics
Olympic silver medalists in athletics (track and field)
Czechoslovak expatriate sportspeople in Mexico
Czechoslovak military personnel
Universiade medalists in athletics (track and field)
Universiade silver medalists for Czechoslovakia
Sportspeople from the Zlín Region